The crowned slaty flycatcher (Griseotyrannus aurantioatrocristatus) is a species of bird in the family Tyrannidae, the tyrant flycatchers. It was formerly united in the genus Empidonomus with the variegated flycatcher, but is now considered the only species of Griseotyrannus. The name Griseotyrannus aurantioatrocristatus means "orange-black crested gray Tyrannus".

It is found in south-central and south-eastern Amazonia. Its natural habitats are subtropical or tropical dry forests and subtropical or tropical moist lowland forests.

The crowned slaty flycatcher migrates into the mostly western and central Amazon basin as a non-breeding resident, except in the southeast bordering the Cerrado and Pantanal, where it is resident in much of the western cerrado and southwards; the migration occurs during the austral winter.

Its binomial is the longest of any bird species, fifteen syllables when spoken aloud.

See also
 List of long species names

References

External links
Photo-High Res; Article geometer–Brazil Birds

crowned slaty flycatcher
Birds of Argentina
Birds of Bolivia
Birds of Brazil
Birds of Uruguay
crowned slaty flycatcher
Taxonomy articles created by Polbot